Lieutenant-General Sir Frederick William Nicholas McCracken,  (18 August 1859 – 8 August 1949) was a British Army officer who saw regimental service in Africa during the late nineteenth century, and later held senior command during the First World War. He commanded an infantry brigade in the British Expeditionary Force (BEF) of 1914, was appointed to command 15th (Scottish) Division in the New Armies from 1915 to 1917, and then briefly commanded XIII Corps on the Western Front before being posted to a home command in the United Kingdom.

Early career
Born in 1859, the youngest son of R. de Crez McCracken of Kent, he studied at Sandhurst and then took a commission as a second lieutenant in the 49th Regiment of Foot on 13 August 1879. He was promoted to lieutenant the following year on 28 July 1880, and served in the Anglo-Egyptian War of 1882 with his regiment, which had since become the 1st Battalion, Royal Berkshire Regiment. After Egypt he was appointed the battalion adjutant, and promoted to captain on 15 December 1884. He saw service during the Mahdist War in 1885, at Tofrek, where he was mentioned in despatches and given a brevet promotion to major on 14 August 1885. Serving on the Egyptian frontier later in the year, he saw action at the Battle of Ginnis.

He married Ann Liston Glover in 1887; the couple had a son and two daughters before Ann's death in 1923.

In April 1892 he was seconded to the staff and appointed Deputy Assistant Adjutant-General in Barbados. He received a full promotion to Major on 27 March 1897, and when his term on the staff expired in April that year he returned to his regiment.

At the outbreak of the Second Boer War in late 1899, he fought in South Africa with the 1st Berkshires throughout 1900, and in 1901 took command of the 2nd Berkshires. In 1902 he commanded a garrison force of several battalions. For his services in the war, he was again mentioned in despatches and given a brevet-promotion to lieutenant-colonel on 29 November 1900. He was awarded the Distinguished Service Order (DSO), as well as the Queen's medal with three clasps, and the King's medal with two. After the end of the war in June 1902, McCracken and the rest of the 2nd battalion was sent to Egypt, where they arrived on the SS Dominion in November 1902.

First World War

After the Boer War, McCracken received a full promotion to lieutenant-colonel in 1903, then a brevet promotion to colonel in 1905. He commanded a battalion of his regiment until 1907, when he was placed on half-pay. He held staff postings in India until 1911, when he was made a brigadier-general on the staff at Irish Command. In 1912 he was given command of the 7th Infantry Brigade, with the temporary rank of brigadier-general, a position he was holding on the outbreak of the First World War.

He commanded the 7th Brigade when it was sent to France in 1914 as part of 3rd Division. At the Battle of Le Cateau in August, McCracken was briefly disabled by an artillery shell on the 26th and was relieved by Colonel W. D. Bird, one of his battalion commanders. The 7th Brigade covered the retreat of II Corps, and after a personal recommendation to the corps commander by Edmund Allenby, who was commanding the Cavalry Division, McCracken was promoted to major-general in October, and appointed Inspector of Infantry.

In 1915 he took command of 15th (Scottish) Division, a New Army division, and led it through the Battle of Loos, the Battle of the Somme, and the Battle of Arras. Whilst he had been praised for his resilience in command of 7th Brigade, reports on his command of the 15th Division were less favourable, with one observer describing him as "weak and lazy". These failings did not stop him being promoted to command XIII Corps in June 1917. He remained with the corps until March 1918, when he was sacked and sent home to take over Scottish Command.

During the war, he was mentioned in despatches a further seven times, and made a Knight Commander of the Order of the Bath. He retired from the Army in 1922, and died in 1949, a few days before his ninetieth birthday.

Notes

References
History of the Great War: Military Operations, France and Belgium 1914, by J. E. Edmonds. Macmillan & Co., London, 1922. Digitised copy
"McCRACKEN, Lieut-General Sir Frederick William Nicholas". (2007). In Who Was Who. Online edition
Robbins, Simon (2005). British Generalship on the Western Front 1914–18: Defeat into Victory. Routledge. 
Obituary in The Times, 9 August 1949, p. 7

 

|-

|-

1859 births
1949 deaths
Military personnel from Kent
British Army personnel of the Anglo-Egyptian War
British Army personnel of the Second Boer War
British Army generals of World War I
49th Regiment of Foot officers
Companions of the Distinguished Service Order
Knights Commander of the Order of the Bath
Royal Berkshire Regiment officers
Graduates of the Royal Military College, Sandhurst
British Army lieutenant generals